Womb (retitled Clone for its UK DVD release) is a 2010 science fiction drama film written and directed by Benedek Fliegauf, and starring Eva Green and Matt Smith.

Plot
The film begins on a beach during a foggy day. A woman (Eva Green) is meditating while she is having tea on the porch of her house. She is in an advanced state of pregnancy. She knows that the father of her child will not return, but she thinks that perhaps her unborn child was the only thing she needed from him. She smiles ominously and begins to reminisce about the events leading up to that moment.

A love story is then told between two children, Rebecca and Tommy, who swear each other eternal love. When Rebecca departs suddenly for Japan with her mother, the two are separated. Twelve years later, Rebecca returns as a young woman to find that Tommy (Matt Smith) not only remembers her, but still cares deeply for her. The two begin a new relationship.

Tommy is a political activist fighting against the biotech corporations, who plan to open a new natural park populated by animals artificially created by cloning. Tommy plans to spoil the inauguration ceremony by letting loose rucksacks filled with cockroaches. Rebecca, herself a computer programmer of leak detection sonar software for underground storage containers, insists on accompanying Tommy.

Driving to the site of the new natural park through a lonely wilderness, Rebecca asks Tommy to stop the car so that she can relieve herself at the side of the road. Meantime, Tommy leaves the car and is struck and killed suddenly by a passing vehicle.

Rebecca and Tommy's parents are stricken with grief. Rebecca wants to use new scientific advancements to have Tommy cloned and thereby bring him back to life. She offers to be impregnated using Tommy's DNA. Though Tommy's mother objects, his father agrees to give Rebecca Tommy's cell material, but urges her to think through her decision carefully before proceeding. Rebecca, however, continues and conceives Tommy's clone in her womb. She visits original Tommy's grave while pregnant with his clone before giving birth by Caesarean section.

Tommy is now raised as Rebecca's son, and the two have a close relationship. Rebecca presents to him a pleo, an artificial living animal created using new biotechnology. Tommy and his playmates observe a neighbourhood girl and try to determine if she has a "copy smell" as the girl is a clone. The neighbourhood mothers display prejudice against "copies", expecting Rebecca to not let Tommy associate with them. Rebecca, though horrified, agrees in order not to isolate her son. Eventually rumours about Tommy spread, and Tommy is forced to celebrate his birthday alone with his mother, his playmates all being barred from attending by their mothers.

Rebecca moves to a more remote location with Tommy. Tommy begins to ask questions about his father, wanting to know how his father died. He buries the pleo his mother gave him for his birthday while out playing with his friend. His mother finds out and gives him back the pleo, which is now no longer working.

Years later, Tommy has grown as old as his original was when he died. As a result, he starts to manifest certain personality traits and interests of the original Tommy (such as his interests in biology). He is now the adult son of still-youthful Rebecca. When Tommy brings a girlfriend, Monica, home to stay with them Rebecca behaves jealously, to both Tommy's and Monica's bewilderment. Tommy struggles with what appears to be sexual tension between himself and his mother. The original Tommy's mother, now an old woman, arrives unexpectedly and stares silently at Tommy, who feels he recognizes the stranger. Frightened and frustrated by Rebecca's lack of explanation, Tommy lashes out at Rebecca, ignoring Monica, who quickly departs.

An angry Tommy demands answers from his mother, Rebecca, who gives him Tommy's original old laptop with photos of him and his original mother and father (the first ones he met before). Tommy throws his mother on the bed in confusion, and asks her who he is and why she did what she did. The sexual tension rises and they both end up having sex. From the blood on Rebecca's hand, it is implied that Tommy took her virginity in the process.

The next day, Tommy packs his things, then addresses Rebecca by her first name (and not "Mom") and thanks her for the life he's had. 

The pregnant Rebecca, from the first scene of the film, is revealed pregnant with Tommy's child.

Cast 
Eva Green as Rebecca
Ruby O. Fee as Rebecca (9 years)
Matt Smith as Thomas
Tristan Christopher as Thomas (10 years)
 Jesse Hoffmann as Thomas (5 years)
Lesley Manville as Judith, Thomas's mother
Peter Wight as Ralph, Thomas's father
István Lénárt as Henry, Rebecca's grandfather
Hannah Murray as Monica, clone Thomas's girlfriend
Natalia Tena as Rose, Thomas's one-time girlfriend
Ella Smith as Molly
Wunmi Mosaku as Erica
Gina Alice Stiebitz as Dima
Amanda Lawrence as Teacher

Production 
The film was shot in Germany on the islands of Langeneß and Sylt and in Sankt Peter-Ording, Hamburg and Berlin.

Release

Critical reception 
On Rotten Tomatoes, the film has received a rating of 35%, based on 20 reviews, with an average rating of 4.9/10.

On Metacritic, the film has a score of 48 out of 100, based on 8 critics, indicating "mixed or average reviews".

References

External links
 

2010 films
2010s science fiction films
English-language French films
English-language German films
English-language Hungarian films
Films scored by Max Richter
Films about cloning
Films about reincarnation
French science fiction films
German science fiction films
Hungarian science fiction films
Incest in film
2010s English-language films
2010s French films
2010s German films